Domenico Mogavero (born March 31, 1947 in Castelbuono) is Bishop of  Mazara del Vallo and former member of the Conferencia Episcopale Siciliana.

References

External links

Biography on Catholic Hierarchy

External links and additional sources
 (for Chronology of Bishops)
 (for Chronology of Bishops)

1947 births
Living people
People from Castelbuono
Bishops in Sicily
21st-century Italian Roman Catholic bishops